Tuaitengphai is a village in the Churachandpur district of Manipur, India.

References

Churachandpur